"Only You" is a song written and recorded by American pop singer Josh Kelley. It was released in June 2005 as the first single from his 2005 studio album, Almost Honest.

Music video
The female love interest in the video is played by actress Katherine Heigl. The two later became a couple, having met on this video shoot, and were married on December 23, 2007. The music video was directed by Marcus Raboy.

CD single

Charts

References

2005 singles
Music videos directed by Marcus Raboy
Josh Kelley songs
Hollywood Records singles
Songs written by Josh Kelley
Songs written by Scott Spock
Songs written by Graham Edwards (musician)
Songs written by Lauren Christy
2005 songs